Míriam Diéguez de Oña (born 4 May 1986), commonly known as Míriam, is a Spanish football midfielder who plays for Alavés. She previously played for Espanyol, Rayo Vallecano and FC Barcelona, winning the league with all three, as well as Málaga and Levante. She was Espanyol's captain during her later years with the team.

At international level, Míriam won the 2004 U-19 European Championship and also represented Spain at the subsequent U-20 World Cup.

She appeared for the senior Spain women's national football team in a 2–2 home draw with Finland on 15 February 2005. In June 2013, national team coach Ignacio Quereda included Míriam in his Spain squad for UEFA Women's Euro 2013 in Sweden.

Honours
Espanyol
 Primera División: 2005–06
 Copa de la Reina: 2006, 2009, 2010

Rayo Vallecano 
 Primera División: 2010–11

Barcelona
 Primera División: 2011–12, 2012–13, 2013–14, 2014–15
 Copa de la Reina: 2013, 2014

References

External links
 

1986 births
Living people
Spanish women's footballers
Spain women's international footballers
Footballers from Catalonia
Primera División (women) players
FC Barcelona Femení players
RCD Espanyol Femenino players
Rayo Vallecano Femenino players
Levante UD Femenino players
Málaga CF Femenino players
Women's association football defenders
Women's association football midfielders
Deportivo Alavés Gloriosas players
People from Santa Coloma de Gramenet
Sportspeople from the Province of Barcelona
CE Sant Gabriel players
Sportswomen from Catalonia
Spain women's youth international footballers
21st-century Spanish women